Remigiusz Jezierski (born January 19, 1976 in Świdnica) is a former Polish footballer.

Successes

1x Polish Cup Winner (2009/2010) with Jagiellonia Białystok.

Career
He is trainee of Polonia Świdnica. In October 2010, he joined Śląsk Wrocław on a one-year contract.

References

External links
 

1976 births
Polish footballers
Polish expatriate footballers
Śląsk Wrocław players
Górnik Łęczna players
Ruch Chorzów players
Hapoel Be'er Sheva F.C. players
Bnei Sakhnin F.C. players
Jagiellonia Białystok players
Ekstraklasa players
Expatriate footballers in Israel
Polish expatriate sportspeople in Israel
Living people
Sportspeople from Olsztyn
Association football forwards